Dinoderus minutus, the Bamboo borer, is a species of wood-boring beetle. In tropical regions (and perhaps others), it is one of the main pests of bamboo, attracted by the internal starch. It is native to Asia but has spread widely with the trade of infested bamboo wood and bamboo products.

References

Bostrichidae
Beetles described in 1775
Taxa named by Johan Christian Fabricius